Watson is a town in Lewis County, New York, United States. The population was 1,881 at the 2010 census. The town is named after early landowner James Watson. The town is at the eastern border of the county and is east of Lowville, the county seat.

History 

The area of Watson was first settled circa 1815. The town was formed from the town of Leyden in 1821. Parts of Watson were later taken to form the towns of Greig (1828), Diana (1830), Croghan (1841) and New Bremen (1848).

Geography

The eastern town line is the border of Herkimer County, and the western town line is partly defined by the Black River.

The Beaver River, a tributary of the Black River, flows through the northern part of the town. The eastern section  of Watson is inside the Adirondack Park.

Demographics

As of the census of 2000, there were 1,987 people, 772 households, and 562 families residing in the town.  The population density was 17.6 people per square mile (6.8/km2).  There were 1,652 housing units at an average density of 14.7 per square mile (5.7/km2).  The racial makeup of the town was 98.49% White, 0.40% African American, 0.20% Native American, 0.10% Asian, 0.40% Pacific Islander, and 0.40% from two or more races. Hispanic or Latino of any race were 0.50% of the population.

There were 772 households, out of which 33.9% had children under the age of 18 living with them, 60.4% were married couples living together, 6.3% had a female householder with no husband present, and 27.2% were non-families. 21.4% of all households were made up of individuals, and 8.9% had someone living alone who was 65 years of age or older.  The average household size was 2.57 and the average family size was 2.96.

In the town, the population was spread out, with 25.6% under the age of 18, 7.2% from 18 to 24, 29.7% from 25 to 44, 23.2% from 45 to 64, and 14.2% who were 65 years of age or older.  The median age was 38 years. For every 100 females, there were 106.3 males.  For every 100 females age 18 and over, there were 108.9 males.

The median income for a household in the town was $35,000, and the median income for a family was $38,438. Males had a median income of $28,208 versus $20,913 for females. The per capita income for the town was $15,708.  About 8.0% of families and 11.3% of the population were below the poverty line, including 13.5% of those under age 18 and 14.2% of those age 65 or over.

Communities and locations in Watson 
Beaver Lake – A lake in the northeastern part of the town by the town line.
Bushes Landing – A hamlet east of Watson Village on County Road 26 and near the Black River.
Chase Lake – A lake south of Sperryville.
Crystal Dale – A location near the northern town line, located north of Petries Corners on County Road 26.
Eagle Falls – A location on the Beaver River in the northern part of the town.
Francis Lake – A lake near the eastern town line, south of Beaver Lake.
Moshier Falls – A location at the eastern town line in Herkimer County.
Number Four – A location in the northeastern part of the town, west of Beaver Lake on County Road 26.
Petries Corners – A hamlet in the southern section  of the town, northeast of Watson village on County Road 26.
Pine Grove – A hamlet near the southern town line, southeast of Watson village. The Pine Grove Community Church was listed on the National Register of Historic Places in 2009.
Soft Maple Reservoir – An artificial lake at the town line by Eagle Falls.
Sperryville – A hamlet in the southern  part of the town, inside the Adirondack Park.
Stony Lake – A lake east of Sperryville.
Watson – The hamlet of Watson is on County Road 26 in the southwestern part of the town by the Black River.

References

External links
 
 Early history of Watson, NY

Towns in Lewis County, New York